Earl Carlson (c. 1925 – c. 1970) was a former ice hockey player who played for the Durham Wasps. He is a member of the British Ice Hockey Hall of Fame.

References
A to Z Encyclopaedia of Ice Hockey entry
British Ice Hockey Hall of Fame entry

1920s births
1970 deaths
Canadian ice hockey forwards
Durham Wasps players
Sportspeople from Kenora
British Ice Hockey Hall of Fame inductees
Canadian expatriate ice hockey players in England